Milind Date (born 28 February) is an Indian flutist and music composer who plays the Bansuri. He studied under Hariprasad Chaurasia and is known for his blowing technique and his playing in various musical styles.

Early life and career
At the age of 21, Date started learning flute from Ajit Soman in his hometown Pune. In a year's time, he was learning from Hariprasad Chaurasia. When Date turned 25, he had already performed with Hridaynath Mangeshkar, Asha Bhosle, Usha Mangeshkar, Yashwant Deo, Suresh Wadkar, Ghulam Ali, Trilok Gurtu and other outstanding musicians. In 1998, Date started a world Music band – "Fusion Ensemble". Date has performed over 3500 Indian classical, fusion and world music concerts.

In 2002, Milind Date began to perform extensively in South Korea and gained recognition for his collaborations with musicians like maestro Kim De Hwan, Beik in Young, Park Chang Soo, Chang Jae Hyo, Mutdance – Kim Young Hee, Jin Bora, Roh Young Sim, Lim won Sik, Park Je Chun, Mi Yeon, Lim dong Chan, Lee Ki Hwa, Park Chi Um, and others. Date is the member of Orientillica - the World Music Ensemble and recorded several albums released in Korea.

Milind Date has performed different styles of music such as Indian classical music, Indian folk music, Devotional Music, Jazz, Arabic, Blues, Rock, Fusion or World Music, and Free Music. He has experimented with several music and dance forms through his performances and recordings.

Date produced and composed an album called "The Earth Concerto" with musicians from Iran, Iraq, Korea, Israel, Morocco and India. This album won several awards in South Korea. Date co-produced the mainstream American pop music album "Fantasy" for the New York-based singer, Angeli. "Prayer from the Heart", a meditation album, was released by Polyglobe Music Austria. For this album Milind has collaborated with Tanmayo, a Scottish singer and violinist, and Shubhangi, an Indian singer.

In 2010, Milind Date produced his debut album of devotional Marathi songs 'Krishna Gaan'. Singers like Suresh Wadkar and Shubhangi Gokhale-Joshi have sung the songs. This album went into private circulations and tens of thousands of copies have been distributed free by many people.

Milind date has recently launched his another live production 'Milind Date Experience' and has been touring with it for last five years. The group has performed in over 500 shows, and is planning to perform internationally.  After Fusion Ensemble Date has gone in Keyboards oriented sound more than the previous Guitar oriented sound for his live performances. Now Date is touring with a steady line up of Charudatta Phadake playing Tabla - Kanjira, Subhash Deshpande playing Keyboards and Abhay Ingale playing various percussions, Dholak Octapad and Djembe. They have traveled extensively in India performing about 300 concerts in the last 3 to 4 years.

In April 2013, Date travelled to USA for the first time. He performed in several concerts, mostly that of Indian Classical Music. From there, Date went on with his first ever around the world tour, called the "World is Round 2013" tour, until October of that year. As a part of this tour, Date performed extensively in South Korea after a gap of 6 years. This was his 11th performance tour to South Korea.

Currently Date is back in India and is busy performing as well as working on his forthcoming 2 albums. He recently performed for an event in Delhi where Honorable President of India was gracing the occasion. In this performance he created a new Woodwind Ensemble. Following wind instruments from India were part of the ensemble Shehnai, Nadaswaram, Venu, Algoza, Pungi, Sundri and Bansuri. This performance was very well appreciated and received by the audience.

Date recently composed music for the film Among the Believers directed by Emmy Award winner Hemal Trivedi. This filmed was released in Tribeca Film Festival. Date also has composed for a film Flying On One Engine in 2008 directed by  Joshua Z. Weinstein.

On the auspicious day of Gudhi Padwa of 2015, Milind's Indian Classical music album 'Milder Milind' was launched by the Kolkata-based 'Qustz World' music label. Milind has played Raag Naagmani, Raag Madhuvanti, Raag Gorakh Kalyan And Bhatiyal Dhun in this album.

USA based record label Neelam Audio Video released yet another of Date's Indian Classical Album Sunand Sarang on the auspicious day of Krishna Janmashtami in 2015. Date has played a new Raga composed by him - Sunand Sarang. This is a variation of the raag Madhymaadi Sarang.

Date released two albums with Manish Vyas a singer and composer. These were released by New Earth Records and Malimba Records. These are that of Meditation Relaxation genre.

Date toured South Korea 12th time in 2015. The tour was a part of his 'East Winds Tour' of Malaysia and Thailand as well as the One Month Festival curated by famous pianist Park Chang Soo.

Milder Milind an album of Date is nominated for Global Indian Music Academy Awards (GiMA) awards in India. GiMA awards colloquially are called as Grammys of India.

Date is currently working on 3 of his albums which should be released in 2017 and 2018. One of the albums working title is Songs of Life. Date says Although the name of the album is Songs of Life, its all an instrumental album.

Among The Believers was nominated for the 2017 Emmy Award.

In November 2019 Date was conferred the prestigious Femina Pune's Most Powerful Award.

On 23 February 2020 Date was conferred the prestigious Economic Times Gen Next Award.

Date is an avid traveller. From January 2021 till July 2021, he travelled solo in his car, all across western India. From Tamil Nadu till Ladakh, Date travelled interacting with local musicians and artisans. He is writing a travel book from his experiences in this travel.

On the auspicious day of Holi of 2022, Date released his new series of albums - Music For Sleep.

Date released 20 albums in the month of August 2022.

New Ragas
Date has been credited with the creation of several new ragas. Most of these are not just a combination of two other already existing raags, but they have special structure. By applying very specific rules, Date has created these Ragas which bear the mark of his style on them. One can find a certain similarity in the Ragas created by Date. Some of these ragas are now performed by his students and the students of his students.

Here is a small list of notable Ragas Date has created -
Zim Kalyan 
Sunand Sarang 
Sunand Bhairav
Hari Mohini (Tribute to his Guru Pandit Hariprasad Chaurasia)
Hari Bhairav (Tribute to his Guru Pandit Hariprasad Chaurasia)
Hussaini Bhairav (Tribute to Ustad Zakir Hussain)
Mugdha Chandrika
Divya Chandrika
Uday Chandrika
Mangeshi Todi (Tribute to Lata Mangeshkar, Asha Bhosale, Hridaynath Mangeshkar and Family)
Narendra Kaunsa (Tribute to Shri Narendra Modi)
Krishna Prabha ( Dedicated to Spiritual Guru Sai Kaka)
Keshav Bhairav ( Dedicated to Keshav Baliram Hegdewar ) (Of Rashtriya Swayamsevak Sangh)
Madhav Bhairav ( Dedicated to M. S. Golwalkar ) (Of Rashtriya Swayamsevak Sangh)

 
Neelam Records of USA has released an album of Raga Sunand Sarang in 2015.

Discography

 Sunand Bhairav Indian Classical Music single
Swar Venu - Indian Classical Music album
 Prabhat Sagar - Indian Classical Music album
 Contemplative Mind - Indian Classical Music album
 The Noble Mind
 Prashanti
 From Anxiety to Ecstasy Meditation Music
 Maitri Bhavana Meditation Music
 Reiki
 Mindfulness
 Ocean and Trees
 Lights of Faith
 A Walk in Himalayas
 Pensive Mind - Music For Sleep - Malkaunsa
 Infinite Mind - Music For Sleep - Hari Mohini
 Krishna Mind - Music For Sleep - Krishna Prabha
 Empathetic Mind - Music For Sleep - Mugdh Chandika
 Quiet Mind - Music For Sleep - Rageshree
 Tranquil Mind - Music For Sleep - Yaman
 Bansuri Lounge
 Chitta Shanti
 Naad Nidra - Shoonyata
 Naad Nidra - Swasth Nidra
 Naad Nidra - Sushupti
 Naad Nidra - Antar Pradnya
 Atma Bhakti - New Earth Records (With Manish Vyas)
 Sunand Sarang - Neelam Audio
 Milder Milind - Questz World [Nominated for GIMA Awards 2016
 Enchanting Kirwani - Live in Concert
  Raag Poorvi - Transcendent Evening
 'Prayer From The Heart'
 'Earth Concerto' - with musicians from 6 countries
 'Fusion Ensemble' - The East West Fusion
 'Fantasy' - Angeli
 'Krishna Gaan' Featuring Suresh Wadkar, Shubhangi Gokhale-Joshi
 'Universe Will Never End' - With Devapath
 'Aayuta ki Pawan' - With 'Sangeet' - Kim JinMook
 Punyapur ki Sarita - Mook Sound - South Korea
 Diamond Sutra - Mook Sound -Winner of Critics Choice Award in South Korea

References

External links

Hindustani instrumentalists
Indian flautists
Bansuri players
Living people
People from Pune
Year of birth missing (living people)
Fergusson College alumni